Mount Burr is a small town in the south-east of South Australia, about  east of Millicent and about  north-west of Mount Gambier, in the Limestone Coast region. It derives its name from a nearby mountain, Mount Burr.

At the 2016 Australian census, Mount Burr had a population of 314.

History
The nearby mountain was named Mount Burr by Governor George Grey after George Dominicus Burr, a surveyor and Professor of Mathematics at Sandhurst Military College. His son, Thomas Burr, a surveyor, accompanied Governor Grey on the expedition to Mount Gambier in 1844:

Also in the surveying party was artist George French Angas.

In 1873, an Act of Parliament was passed which encouraged the planting of forests, and the South Australian Department of Woods and Forests was quite likely the first government forestry department created in the British Commonwealth. The first trees planted included not only the native eucalypts, but also hardwoods from Europe and conifers from Europe and North America. The radiata pine, native to California, proved especially successful, and huge numbers were planted.

The town of Mount Burr was established in 1931, home to a large timber mill which was the first of its kind in the area. The town and all of its facilities were built by the Government of South Australia in the middle of a forest, mostly using locally sawn timber.

A cricket and football club were established in 1932 and 1940 respectively.

In October 1965, when the first regional South Australian commercial television station, SES-8, located at Mount Gambier, was readying for transmission in the South-east, a tensioning cable on a  transmitter mast broke, and the steel tower crashed to the ground. Fortunately nobody was seriously injured and the launch went ahead in March 1966. SES-8 was sold to WIN Television in 1999, and regional broadcasting from Mt Gambier ceased in 2013.

In late 2000 the timber mill closed.

Geography
Mount Burr lies within the Limestone Coast region.

The mountain of Mount Burr is home to the SES-8 television transmitter, which is responsible for transmitting WIN Television, Seven SA, Ten SA, SBS and ABC television to households across the south-east of SA and western Victoria.

Demographics
At the 2016 Australian census, Mount Burr had a population of 314, consisting of 91 families of mostly Anglo-Australian ancestry.

Facilities, industries and attractions
The main industries in the town are forestry, transport and agriculture. Paper manufacturer Kimberly-Clark is a major source of employment.

Mt Burr Primary School caters for children from pre-school age through to Year 7.

Mt Burr Forest is a forest reserve, named after Thomas Burr, deputy surveyor of the town. Within the forest live endangered species such as the southern brown bandicoot, as well as the red-necked wallaby, emus and more than 60 other species of birds.

Historic buildings
The historic Mount Graham Homestead is listed on the South Australian Heritage Register, as is the Noolook Bark Mill, which is within Mt Burr Forest.

Mount Burr Swamp
Mount Burr Swamp is a large, former deep freshwater marsh, managed by Nature Glenelg Trust with the aim of restoring the  wetlands which lie adjacent to The Marshes Wetland Complex. Mount Burr Swamp is an area of great biodiversity, providing habitat for little galaxias (fish), growling grass frog, Australasian bitterns, southern brown bandicoots, red-tailed black cockatoos, brolgas and southern bent-wing bats.

In mid-2021, students from the University of South Australia's 18-month Aboriginal Pathways Program accompanied local Aboriginal elders on a land management course at the swamp. Traditional methods of conservation are taught, and the students are experience connection to country and caring for country.

See also
Burr (disambiguation)

Notes and references

Towns in South Australia
Limestone Coast